David Magidson (born March 6, 1963) is an American professional clown. As his character Boswick the Clown, he has performed for Ringling Bros. and Barnum & Bailey Circus and Make A Circus. He has appeared as a clown in the movies Milk and Dr. Dolittle, as well in commercials for the Pacific Bell Yellow pages, Nissan, and BMW. Since 2010, Magidson has written a blog on Blogger "designed to help family entertainers with all aspects of their performing." As David Magidson, he performed as a member of the comedy-troupe "The Kloons" and in the San Francisco Fringe Festival. As the character Boswick the Clown, Magidson appears at over 300 events each year, including schools and libraries, specializing in large juggling, magic, and comedy clown shows for children 4 years old to 8 years old.

David Magidson lives in San Francisco with his wife and two children.

Notable Works
David Magidson is the author of the children's joke book "Hey Quit Clowning Around—Think Talk and Act Like a Clown"  He has also co-written and starred as Boswick the Clown in the children's DVDs "Here Comes The Clown" as well as "Here Comes Boswick the Clown with Phoebe the Duck", directed by Jay Alexander.

He has written and starred in two one-man shows. "Through the Eyes of a Clown" was featured in the 2014 San Francisco Fringe Festival. "Pushing 40," cowritten with Ty DeMartino, played at the Shelton Theater as part of the 2003 Comedy on the Square Festival.

References

External links
Boswick The Clown Official Website
Official Blog

Boswick the Clown
Magidson, David
Magidson, David
Ringling Bros. and Barnum & Bailey Circus
Magidson, David